A grenade is an explosive weapon typically thrown by hand (also called hand grenade), but can also refer to a shell (explosive projectile) shot from the muzzle of a rifle (as a rifle grenade) or a grenade launcher. A modern hand grenade generally consists of an explosive charge ("filler"), a detonator mechanism, an internal striker to trigger the detonator, and a safety lever secured by a cotter pin. The user removes the safety pin before throwing, and once the grenade leaves the hand the safety lever gets released, allowing the striker to trigger a primer that ignites a fuze (sometimes called the delay element), which burns down to the detonator and explodes the main charge.

Grenades work by dispersing fragments (fragmentation grenades), shockwaves (high-explosive, anti-tank and stun grenades), chemical aerosols (smoke and gas grenades) or fire (incendiary grenades). Fragmentation grenades ("frags") are probably the most common in modern armies,  and when the word grenade is used in everyday speech, it is generally assumed to refer to a fragmentation grenade. Their outer casings, generally made of a hard synthetic material or steel, are designed to rupture and fragment on detonation, sending out numerous fragments (shards and splinters) as fast-flying projectiles. In modern grenades, a pre-formed fragmentation matrix inside the grenade is commonly used, which may be spherical, cuboid, wire or notched wire. Most anti-personnel (AP) grenades are designed to detonate either after a time delay or on impact.

Grenades are often spherical, cylindrical, ovoid or truncated ovoid in shape, and of a size that fits the hand of a normal adult. Some grenades are mounted at the end of a handle and known as "stick grenades". The stick design provides leverage for throwing longer distances, but at the cost of additional weight and length, and has been considered obsolete by western countries since the Second World War and Cold War periods. A friction igniter inside the handle or on the top of the grenade head was used to initiate the fuse.

Etymology
The word grenade is likely derived from the French word spelled exactly the same, meaning pomegranate, as the bomb is reminiscent of the many-seeded fruit in size and shape. Its first use in English dates from the 1590s.

History

Pre-gunpowder

Rudimentary incendiary grenades appeared in the Eastern Roman (Byzantine) Empire, not long after the reign of Leo III (717–741). Byzantine soldiers learned that Greek fire, a Byzantine invention of the previous century, could not only be thrown by flamethrowers at the enemy but also in stone and ceramic jars. Later, glass containers were employed. The use of such explosive missiles soon spread to Muslim armies in the Near East, from where it reached China by the 10th century.

Gunpowder

In China, during the Song Dynasty (960–1279 AD), weapons known as Zhen Tian Lei ("Sky-shaking Thunder") were created when Chinese soldiers packed gunpowder into ceramic or metal containers fitted with fuses. In 1044, a military book Wujing Zongyao ("Compilation of Military Classics") described various gunpowder recipes in which one can find, according to Joseph Needham, the prototype of the modern hand grenade. The mid-14th-century book Huolongjing ("Fire Dragon Manual"), written by Jiao Yu, recorded an earlier Song-era cast-iron cannon known as the "flying-cloud thunderclap cannon". The manuscript stated that (Needham's modified Wade-Giles spelling):

Grenade-like devices were also known in ancient India. In a 12th-century work Mujmalut Tawarikh based on an Arabic work which is itself based on original Sanskrit work, a terracotta elephant filled with explosives set with a fuse was placed hidden in the van and exploded as the invading army approached near.

The first cast-iron bombshells and grenades appeared in Europe in 1467, where their initial role was with the besieging and defense of castles and fortifications. A hoard of several hundred ceramic hand grenades was discovered during construction in front of a bastion of the Bavarian city of Ingolstadt, Germany dated to the 17th century. Many of the grenades retained their original black powder loads and igniters. The grenades were most likely intentionally dumped in the moat of the bastion prior to 1723. By the mid 17th century, infantry known as Grenadiers began to emerge in the armies of Europe, who specialized in shock and close quarters combat, mostly with the usage of grenades and fierce melee combat. In 1643, it is possible that "Grenados" were thrown amongst the Welsh at Holt Bridge during the English Civil War. The word "grenade" was also used during the events surrounding the Glorious Revolution in 1688, where cricket ball-sized ( in circumference) iron spheres packed with gunpowder and fitted with slow-burning wicks were first used against the Jacobites in the battles of Killiecrankie and Glen Shiel. These grenades were not very effective owing both to the unreliability of their fuse, as well inconsistent times to detonation, and as a result, saw little use. Grenades were also used during the Golden Age of Piracy, especially during boarding actions; pirate Captain Thompson used "vast numbers of powder flasks, grenade shells, and stinkpots" to defeat two pirate-hunters sent by the Governor of Jamaica in 1721.

Improvised grenades were increasingly used from the mid-19th century, the confines of trenches enhancing the effect of small explosive devices. In a letter to his sister, Colonel Hugh Robert Hibbert described an improvised grenade that was employed by British troops during the Crimean War (1854–1856):

In the American Civil War, both sides used hand grenades equipped with a plunger that detonated the device on impact. The Union relied on experimental Ketchum Grenades, which had a tail to ensure that the nose would strike the target and start the fuze. They also used 'Rains' and 'Adams' grenades, which were similar to the Ketchum in appearance and mechanism. Improvised hand grenades were also used to great effect by the Russian defenders of Port Arthur during the Russo-Japanese War.

Development of modern grenades

Around the turn of the 20th century, the ineffectiveness of the available types of hand grenades, coupled with their levels of danger to the user and difficulty of operation, meant that they were regarded as increasingly obsolete pieces of military equipment. In 1902, the British War Office announced that hand grenades were obsolete and had no place in modern warfare. But within two years, following the success of improvised grenades in the trench warfare conditions of the Russo-Japanese War, and reports from General Sir Aylmer Haldane, a British observer of the conflict, a reassessment was quickly made and the Board of Ordnance was instructed to develop a practical hand grenade. Various models using a percussion fuze were built, but this type of fuze suffered from various practical problems, and they were not commissioned in large numbers.

Marten Hale, better known for patenting the Hales rifle grenade, developed a modern hand grenade in 1906 but was unsuccessful in persuading the British Army to adopt the weapon until 1913. Hale's chief competitor was Nils Waltersen Aasen, who invented his design in 1906 in Norway, receiving a patent for it in England. Aasen began his experiments with developing a grenade while serving as a sergeant in the Oscarsborg Fortress. Aasen formed the Aasenske Granatkompani in Denmark, which before the First World War produced and exported hand grenades in large numbers across Europe. He had success in marketing his weapon to the French and was appointed as a Knight of the French Legion of Honour in 1916 for the invention.

The Royal Laboratory developed the No. 1 grenade in 1908. It contained explosive material with an iron fragmentation band, with an impact fuze, detonating when the top of the grenade hit the ground. A long cane handle (approximately 16 inches or 40 cm) allowed the user to throw the grenade farther than the blast of the explosion. It suffered from the handicap that the percussion fuse was armed before throwing, which meant that if the user was in a trench or other confined space, he was apt to detonate it and kill himself when he drew back his arm to throw it.

Early in World War I, combatant nations only had small grenades, similar to Hales' and Aasen's design. The Italian Besozzi grenade had a five-second fuze with a match-tip that was ignited by striking on a ring on the soldier's hand. As an interim measure, troops often improvised their own grenades, such as the jam tin grenade.

Fragmentation grenade

Improvised grenades were replaced when manufactured versions became available. The first modern fragmentation grenade was the Mills bomb, which became available to British front-line troops in 1915.

William Mills, a hand grenade designer from Sunderland, patented, developed and manufactured the "Mills bomb" at the Mills Munition Factory in Birmingham, England in 1915, designating it the No.5. It was described as the first "safe grenade." They were explosive-filled steel canisters with a triggering pin and a distinctive deeply notched surface. This segmentation is often erroneously thought to aid fragmentation, though Mills' own notes show the external grooves were purely to aid the soldier to grip the weapon.  Improved fragmentation designs were later made with the notches on the inside, but at that time they would have been too expensive to produce. The external segmentation of the original Mills bomb was retained, as it provided a positive grip surface. This basic "pin-and-pineapple" design is still used in some modern grenades.

The Mills bomb underwent numerous modifications. The No. 23 was a variant of the No. 5 with a rodded base plug which allowed it to be fired from a rifle. This concept evolved further with the No. 36, a variant with a detachable base plate to allow use with a rifle discharger cup. The final variation of the Mills bomb, the No. 36M, was specially designed and waterproofed with shellac for use initially in the hot climate of Mesopotamia in 1917, and remained in production for many years. By 1918, the No. 5 and No. 23 were declared obsolete and the No. 36 (but not the 36M) followed in 1932.

The Mills had a grooved cast-iron "pineapple" with a central striker held by a close hand lever and secured with a pin. A competent thrower could manage  with reasonable accuracy, but the grenade could throw lethal fragments farther than this; after throwing, the user had to take cover immediately.

Approximately 75,000,000 grenades were manufactured during World War I, used in the war and remaining in use through to the Second World War. At first, the grenade was fitted with a seven-second fuze, but during combat in the Battle of France in 1940, this delay proved too long, giving defenders time to escape the explosion or to throw the grenade back, so the delay was reduced to four seconds.

The F1 grenade was first produced in limited quantities by France in May 1915. This new weapon had improvements from the experience of the first months of the war: the shape was more modern, with an external groove pattern for better grip and easier fragmentation. The second expectation proved deceptive, as the explosion in practice gave no more than 10 fragments (although the pattern was designed to split into all the 38 drawn divisions). The design proved to be very functional, especially due to its stability compared to other grenades of the same period. The F1 was used by many foreign armies from 1915 to 1940.

Stick grenade

Stick grenades have a long handle attached to the grenade proper, providing leverage for longer throwing distance, at the cost of additional weight.

The British introduced their No. 1 grenade in 1908. It had been designed on reports of Japanese weapons used in the Russo-Japanese war. The handle was very long and a streamer tied to the end was used to ensure the fuse hit the ground properly.

The term "stick grenade" is commonly associated with the German Stielhandgranate introduced in 1915 and developed throughout World War I. A friction igniter was used; this method was uncommon in other countries but widely used for German grenades.

A pull cord ran down the hollow handle from the detonator within the explosive head, terminating in a porcelain ball held in place by a detachable base closing cap. To use the grenade, the base cap was unscrewed, permitting the ball and cord to fall out. Pulling the cord dragged a roughened steel rod through the igniter, causing it to spark and start the five-second fuze burning. This simple design (popularly known as the "potato masher") continued to evolve throughout the First and Second World Wars, with the Model 24 grenade  becoming one of the most easily recognized of all German small arms. The German Model 43 grenade was a low-cost version introduced late in the war.

Other stick grenades were made, including the Russian RGD-33 and Model 1914 grenades, and the British sticky bomb.

Further development

During World War II the United Kingdom used incendiary grenades based on white phosphorus. One model, the No. 76 special incendiary grenade, was mainly issued to the Home Guard as an anti-tank weapon. It was produced in vast numbers; by August 1941 well over 6,000,000 had been manufactured.

The United States developed the Mk 2 hand grenade before the war, nicknamed the "pineapple" for its grooved surface. This weapon was widely used by American G.I.s. The heavy, segmented bodies of "pineapple" type grenades produce an unpredictable pattern of fragmentation. After the Second World War, Britain adopted grenades that contained segmented coiled wire in smooth metal casings. Despite this, the Mills bomb remained the standard grenade of the British Armed Forces and was manufactured in the UK until 1972, when it was replaced by the L2 series.

Explosive grenades

Fragmentation (defensive)

Fragmentation grenades are common in armies. They are weapons that are designed to disperse fragments on detonation, aimed to damage targets within as the lethal and injury radii. The body is generally made of a hard synthetic material or steel, which will provide some fragmentation as shards and splinters, though in modern grenades a pre-formed fragmentation matrix is often used. The pre-formed fragmentation may be spherical, cuboid, wire or notched wire. Most AP grenades are designed to detonate either after a time delay or on impact.

When the word grenade is used without specification, and context does not suggest otherwise, it is generally assumed to refer to a fragmentation grenade.

Fragmentation grenades can be divided into two main types, defensive and offensive, where the former are designed to be used from a position of cover (e.g. in a slit trench or behind a suitable wall) against an open area outside, and have an effective kill radius greater than the distance they can be thrown; while the latter are for use by assaulting troops, and have a smaller effective radius.

The Mills bombs and the French/Soviet F1 are examples of defensive grenades. The Dutch V40, Swiss HG 85, and US MK3 are examples of offensive grenades.

High explosive (offensive)

The high explosive (HE) or concussion grenade is an anti-personnel device that is designed to damage, daze or otherwise stun its targets with overpressure shockwaves. Compared to fragmentation grenades, the explosive filler is usually of a greater weight and volume, and the case is much thinner – the US MK3A2 concussion grenade, for example, has a body of fiber (similar to the packing container for the fragmentation grenade).

These grenades are usually classed as offensive weapons because the effective casualty radius is much less than the distance it can be thrown, and its explosive power works better within more confined spaces such as fortifications or buildings, where entrenched defenders often occupy. The concussion effect, rather than any expelled fragments, is the effective killer.

Concussion grenades have also been used as depth charges (underwater explosives) around boats and underwater targets; some like the US Mk 40 concussion grenade are designed for use against enemy divers and frogmen. Underwater explosions kill or otherwise incapacitate the target by creating a lethal shock wave underwater.

The US Army Armament Research, Development and Engineering Center (ARDEC) announced in 2016 that they were developing a grenade which could operate in either fragmentation or blast mode (selected at any time before throwing), the electronically fuzed enhanced tactical multi-purpose (ET-MP) hand grenade.

Some concussion grenades with cylindrical bodies can be converted into fragmentation grenades by coupling with a separate factory-made payload of fragments wrapped around the outside: a "fragmentation sleeve (jacket)", as shown in the WW2 Splitterring sleeves for the stick grenade and M39 "egg hand grenade".

Anti-tank

A range of hand-thrown grenades have been designed for use against heavy armored vehicles. An early and unreliable example was the British sticky bomb of 1940, which was too short-ranged to use effectively. Designs such as the German Panzerwurfmine (L) and the Soviet RPG-43, RPG-40, RPG-6 and RKG-3 series of grenades used a high-explosive anti-tank (HEAT) warhead using a cone-shaped cavity on one end and some method to stabilize flight and increase the probability of right angle impact for the shaped charge's metal stream to effectively penetrate the tank armor.

Due to improvements in modern vehicle armor, anti-tank hand grenades have become almost obsolete and replaced by rocket-propelled shaped charges. However, they were still used with limited success against lightly-armored mine-resistant ambush protected (MRAP) vehicles, designed for protection only against improvised explosive devices in the Iraqi insurgency in the early 2000s.

Stun

A stun grenade, also known as a flash grenade or flashbang, is a non-lethal weapon. The first devices like this were created in the 1960s at the order of the British Special Air Service as a distraction grenade.

It is designed to produce a blinding flash of light and loud noise without causing permanent injury. The flash produced momentarily activates all light sensitive cells in the eye, making vision impossible for approximately five seconds, until the eye restores itself to its normal, unstimulated state. The loud blast causes temporary loss of hearing, and also disturbs the fluid in the ear, causing loss of balance.

These grenades are designed to temporarily neutralize the combat effectiveness of enemies by disorienting their senses.

When detonated, the fuze-grenade body assembly remains intact. The body is a tube with holes along the sides that emit the light and sound of the explosion. The explosion does not generally cause fragmentation injury, but can still burn. The concussive blast of the detonation can injure and the heat created can ignite flammable materials such as fuel. The fires that occurred during the Iranian Embassy Siege in London were caused by stun grenades.

Sting

Sting grenades, also known as stingball or sting ball grenades, are stun grenades based on the design of the fragmentation grenade. Instead of using a metal casing to produce fragmentation, they are made from hard rubber and are filled with around 100 rubber or plastic balls. On detonation, these balls, and fragments from the rubber casing explode outward in all directions as reduced lethality projectiles, which may ricochet. It is intended that people struck by the projectiles will receive a series of fast, painful stings, without serious injury. Some types have an additional payload of CS gas.

Sting grenades do not reliably incapacitate people, so they can be dangerous to use against armed subjects. However, they can sometimes cause serious physical injury, especially the rubber fragments from the casing. People have lost eyes and hands to sting grenades.

Sting grenades are sometimes called "stinger grenades", which is a genericized trademark as "Stinger" is trademarked by Defense Technology for its line of sting grenades.

Chemical and gas

Chemical and gas grenades burn or release a gas, and do not explode. 

Smoke grenades are used as ground-to-ground or ground-to-air signaling devices, target or landing zone marking devices, and to create a smoke-screen for concealment. The body is a sheet-steel cylinder with emission holes in the top and bottom. These allow the smoke to be released when the grenade is ignited. There are two main types, one producing coloured smoke for signaling, and the other is used for screening smoke. Screening smoke grenades usually contain HC (hexachloroethane/zinc) or TA (terephthalic acid) smoke mixture and white phosphorus (WP) and red phosphorus (RP). HC smoke contains hydrochloric acid and is harmful to breathe. These grenades can become hot enough to scald or burn unprotected skin, particularly the phosphorus type grenades.

Tear gas grenades are similar to smoke grenades in shape and operation. In tear gas grenades, the filler is generally  of CS gas combined with a pyrotechnic composition which burns to generate an aerosol of CS-laden smoke. This causes extreme irritation to the eyes and, if inhaled, to the nose and throat.  Occasionally CR gas is used instead of CS.

Incendiary grenades produce intense heat by means of a chemical reaction. Seventh-century "Greek fire" first used by the Byzantine Empire, which could be lit and thrown in breakable pottery, could be considered the earliest form of incendiary grenade.

The body of modern incendiary grenades is often similar in appearance to that of a smoke grenade,  though generally smaller in size. The filler can be various chemicals,  and while white phosphorus is well known, red phosphorus is also used for a number of reasons,  not least because it is more stable and requires ignition,  making it a safer option for the troops using it.
White phosphorus was used in the British No. 77 Mk. 1 and in a solution form for the British Home Guard's No 76 special incendiary grenade during World War II.

The Molotov cocktail is an improvised incendiary grenade made with a glass bottle typically filled with gasoline (petrol), although sometimes another flammable liquid or mixture is used. The Molotov cocktail is ignited by a burning strip of cloth or a rag stuffed in the bottle's orifice when it shatters against its target which sets a small area on fire. The Molotov cocktail received its name during the Soviet invasion of Finland in 1939 (the Winter War) by Finnish troops after the former Soviet foreign minister Vyacheslav Molotov, whom they deemed responsible for the war. A similar weapon was used earlier in the decade by Franco's troops during the Spanish Civil War.

Practice

Practice or simulation grenades are similar in handling and function to other hand grenades, except that they only produce a loud popping noise and a puff of smoke on detonation. The grenade body can be reused. Another type is the throwing practice grenade which is completely inert and often cast in one piece. It is used to give soldiers a feel for the weight and shape of real grenades and for practicing precision throwing. Examples of practice grenades include the K417 Biodegradable Practice Hand Grenade by CNOTech Korea.

Design 

Various fuzes (detonation mechanisms) are used, depending on purpose:

 Impact Examples of grenades fitted with contact fuzes are the German M1913 and M1915 Diskushandgranate, and British grenades fitted with the No. 247 "All ways" fuze - these were the No. 69 grenade, No. 70 grenade, No. 73 grenade, No. 77 grenade, No.79 grenade and No. 82 grenade (Gammon bomb).
 Instantaneous fuze These have no delay and were mainly used for victim actuated booby traps: they can be pull,  pressure or release switches.  Booby traps are classed as mines under the Ottawa Treaty.
 Timed fuze In a timed fuze grenade, the fuze is ignited on the release of the safety lever, or by pulling the igniter cord in the case of many stick grenades, and detonation occurs following a timed delay. Timed fuze grenades are generally preferred to hand-thrown percussion grenades because their fusing mechanisms are safer and more robust than those used in percussion grenades. Fuzes are commonly fixed, though the Russian UZRGM fuzes are interchangeable and allow the delay to be varied, or replaced by a zero-delay pull fuze. This is potentially dangerous due to the risk of confusion by operators.

Beyond the basic "pin-and-lever" mechanism, many contemporary grenades have other safety features. The main ones are the safety clip and a locking end to the release pin. The clip was introduced in the M61 grenade (1960s, Vietnam War), and was also then known as the "jungle clip" – it provides a backup for the safety pin, in case it is dislodged, eg. by jungle flora. This is particularly important as poorly trained troops have been known to use the safety lever as a hook from which to suspend the grenade, despite the apparently obvious danger this poses.  The 2016 US ET-MP uses a user-settable timed electronic fuze, though neither the fuze nor grenade have yet been accepted into service anywhere in the world.

Use 

The classic hand grenade design has a safety handle or lever (known in the US forces as a spoon) and a removable safety pin that prevents the handle from being released: the safety lever is spring-loaded, and once the safety pin is removed, the lever will release and ignite the detonator, then fall off. Thus, to use a grenade, the lever is grasped (to prevent release), then the pin is removed, and then the grenade is thrown, which releases the lever and ignites the detonator, triggering an explosion. Some grenade types also have a safety clip to prevent the handle from coming off in transit.

To use a grenade, the soldier grips it with the throwing hand, ensuring that the thumb holds the safety lever in place; if there is a safety clip, it is removed prior to use. Left-handed soldiers invert the grenade, so the thumb is still the digit that holds the safety lever. The soldier then grabs the safety pin's pull ring with the index or middle finger of the other hand and removes it. They then throw the grenade towards the target. Soldiers are trained to throw grenades in standing, prone-to-standing, kneeling, prone-to-kneeling, and alternative prone positions and in under- or side-arm throws. If the grenade is thrown from a standing position the thrower must then immediately seek cover or lie prone if no cover is nearby.

Once the soldier throws the grenade, the safety lever releases, the striker throws the safety lever away from the grenade body as it rotates to detonate the primer. The primer explodes and ignites the fuze (sometimes called the delay element). The fuze burns down to the detonator, which explodes the main charge.

When using an antipersonnel grenade, the objective is to have the grenade explode so that the target is within its effective radius. Within this range, people are generally injured badly enough to effectively render them harmless.

An alternative technique is to release the lever before throwing the grenade, which allows the fuze to burn partially and decrease the time to detonation after throwing; this is referred to as cooking. A shorter delay is useful to reduce the ability of the enemy to take cover, throw or kick the grenade away and can also be used to allow a fragmentation grenade to explode into the air over defensive positions. This technique is inherently dangerous, due to shorter delay (meaning a closer explosion), greater complexity (must make sure to throw after waiting), and increased variability (fuzes vary from grenade to grenade), and thus is discouraged in the U.S. Marine Corps, and banned in training. Nonetheless, cooking a grenade and throwing one back is frequently seen in Hollywood films and video games.

Tactical applications
Tactics vary by the type of engagement. Urban warfare, particularly the attack of built-up (fortified, buildings etc.) areas, involves the heavy use of hand grenades: typically a grenade or two are thrown before each transition (entering a room or navigating a stairway). A World War II battalion fighting in a city frequently used 500 grenades per day.

A key concern is that the grenade is picked up and thrown away or back at the thrower. The USMC's preferred technique to prevent this is a hard-throw, skip/bounce technique, where the grenade is thrown hard enough that it bounces or skips around, being hard to pick up and throw back – this is applicable when clearing a room, for instance. In other uses, such as to reach upper floors of a building, a grenade may be lobbed for greater distance or accuracy.

Throwing a grenade upstairs is dangerous, due to the risk of it falling back down; it is much safer to throw a grenade downstairs, so it is safer to capture a building from the top, rather than the bottom. Grenades generally explode near the floor, causing spalling downwards towards lower floors.

The preferred technique in the US forces when attacking is to show the grenade to nearby friendly forces, receiving a visual acknowledgment, to avoid alerting the enemy. Alternatively, a voice alert can be given immediately after throwing the grenade, shouting "frag out" (for "fragmentation grenade outgoing"); this reduces or eliminates the element of surprise. Conversely, on identifying an incoming enemy grenade, friendly forces shout "grenade".

Booby traps

Grenades have often been used in the field to construct booby traps, using some action of the intended target (such as opening a door or starting a car) to trigger the grenade. These grenade-based booby traps are simple to construct in the field as long as instant fuzes are available; a delay in detonation can allow the intended target to take cover. The most basic technique involves wedging a grenade in a tight spot so the safety lever does not leave the grenade when the pin is pulled. A string is then tied from the head assembly to another stationary object. When a soldier steps on the string, the grenade is pulled out of the narrow passageway, the safety lever is released, and the grenade detonates.

Abandoned booby traps and discarded grenades contribute to the problem of unexploded ordnance (UXO). The use of target triggered grenades and AP mines is banned to the signatories of the Ottawa Treaty and may be treated as a war crime wherever it is ratified. Many countries, including India, the People's Republic of China, Russia, and the United States, have not signed the treaty citing self-defense needs.

Cultural impact

Stylized pictures of early grenades, emitting a flame, are used as ornaments on military uniforms, particularly in Britain, France (esp. French gendarmerie and the French Army), and Italy (carabinieri). Fusilier regiments in the British and Commonwealth tradition (e.g. the Princess Louise Fusiliers, Canadian Army) wear a cap-badge depicting flaming grenade, reflecting their historic use of grenades in the assault. The British Grenadier Guards took their name and cap badge of a burning grenade from repelling an attack of French grenadiers at Waterloo. The Spanish artillery arm uses a flaming grenade as its badge. The flag of the Russian Ground Forces also bears a flaming grenade device. Ukrainian mechanized infantry and engineers use a flaming grenade in their branch insignia. The Finnish Army Corps of Engineers' emblem consists of a stick hand grenade (symbolizing demolition) and a shovel (symbolizing construction) in saltire.

The branch insignia of the United States Army Ordnance Corps also uses this symbol, the grenade being symbolic of explosive ordnance in general. The United States Marine Corps uses the grenade as part of the insignia for one officer rank and one staff NCO rank on their uniforms. Additionally, the rank insignia for master gunnery sergeant has three chevrons pointing up, with four rockers on the bottom. In the middle of this is a bursting bomb or grenade. U.S.  Navy aviation ordnanceman's rating badge features a winged device of similar design.

Legislation
In the United States grenades are classed as destructive devices, a form of Title II weapons under the National Firearms Act. They must consequently be registered with the Bureau of Alcohol, Tobacco, Firearms, and Explosives (ATF), are taxed, and are illegal in states that ban Title II weapons. While in principle it is possible to legally obtain and possess hand grenades in some states, in practice they are not generally available.

Manufacturing
Modern manufacturers of hand grenades include:
Agenzia Industrie della Difesa (Italy)
Diehl (Germany)
Mecar (Belgium)
Rheinmetall (Germany, formerly Arges, Austria)
Ruag (Switzerland)
Nammo (Norway)
Instalaza (Spain)
Solar Industries (India)
MKEK (Turkey)

See also
Ketchum Grenade
Pipe bomb
Rocket-propelled grenade
Satchel charge
Technology of the Song Dynasty
TM 31-210 Improvised Munitions Handbook

References

Citations

General sources

Needham, Joseph (1986). Science and Civilization in China: Volume 5, Part 7. Taipei: Caves Books, Ltd.

External links

"Getting Good with the Grenade...It Pays!" – November 1944 Popular Science article with complete history, cutaway, and illustrations
"How Grenades Work" – from HowStuffWorks

 
 
8th-century introductions
Byzantine inventions
Incendiary weapons
Infantry weapons
Non-lethal weapons